The Uganda women's national under-18 basketball team is a national basketball team of Uganda, administered by the Federation of Uganda Basketball Association.
It represents the country in women's international under-18 (under age 18) basketball competitions.

See also
Uganda women's national basketball team
Uganda men's national under-18 basketball team

References

External links
Archived records of Uganda team participations

U18
Women's national under-18 basketball teams